Comics Britannia is a three-part documentary series from BBC Four which started on 10 September 2007. It was then repeated on BBC Two starting on 19 July 2008.

The series looks at the history of the British comic and is also the centre of a Comics Britannia season.

Episodes
The three programs look at the main periods of British comics. They are narrated by Armando Iannucci.

The Fun Factory
First shown on Monday 10 September, this documentary looks at the early years of British comics.

It features the launch of The Dandy and follows the growth of the British comics industry through to the 1960s.

Boys and Girls
First shown on Monday 17 September, the episode looks at the appearance of a large range of comics in the post-war era specifically aimed at boys (Eagle) and girls (Bunty, Girl).

X-Rated: Anarchy in the UK
First aired on Monday 24 September, it looks at the trend towards darker comics in the 1970s and 1980s with the launch of 2000 AD and the rise of Alan Moore resulting in the "British Invasion" of the American comics industry.

Comics Britannia season
The rest of the season includes documentaries (not necessarily about British comics and artists):

 In Search of Steve Ditko
 Heath Robinson: Suburban Subversive
 Happy Birthday Broons!
 Happy Birthday Wullie
 In Search of Moebius: Jean Giraud
 Tintin and I
 The Comic Strip Hero, Arena documentary about Superman

As well as relevant films and television series:

My Name Is Modesty, the 2003 Modesty Blaise film
 Tron, the 1982 film (Moebius designed the graphical look)
 Repeats of the 1960s Batman series

See also
 List of Britannia documentaries

Notes

References
Comics Britannia series details at the BBC
Comics Britannia season details at the BBC
BBC to screen history of comics, The Guardian, 10 August 2007
Down the Tubes overview of the season

External links
 

Review of the first episode by Charlie Brooker, The Guardian, 8 September 2007
Last cowboy in town, The Times, 8 September 2007
Comics Britannia, thelondonpaper, 10 September 2007
Last night on television: Comics Britannia (BBC4), The Daily Telegraph, 11 September 2007

Documentary films about comics
BBC television documentaries
2000s British documentary television series
2007 British television series debuts
2007 British television series endings